Sign Pine is an unincorporated community in Chowan County, North Carolina, United States.

References

Unincorporated communities in Chowan County, North Carolina
Unincorporated communities in North Carolina